The 1962–63 Turkish National League was the fifth season of professional football in Turkey and the last year the top division in Turkey was named the Turkish National League. With the creation of the 2.Lig in 1963–64, the top-flight football division in Turkey would be re-branded as the 1.Lig. Galatasaray won their second league title.

Overview
Galatasaray won their second title, becoming the first club to win back-to-back league titles. Beşiktaş finished runners-up, with Fenerbahçe rounding out the top three. Galatasaray qualified for the European Cup. With Galatasaray having already qualified for the European Cup, Turkish Cup runners-up Fenerbahçe were sent to compete in the European Cup Winners' Cup instead. Altay qualified for the Balkans Cup and the Inter-Cities Fairs Cup, and Beşiktaş qualified for the Balkans Cup. Metin Oktay finished top scorer with a total of 38 goals; 16 in the group stages and 22 in the finals.

A new format was put into place for this season only: the 22 clubs competing were split into two groups of 11. The top six clubs from each group qualified for the final group. Clubs finishing 7 to 9 qualified for the classification group, while clubs in 10th and 11th place were relegated to the newly created 2.Lig. The final group consisted of twelve clubs and was played as if it were a regular league, except no clubs were relegated. The clubs who qualified for the classification group played each other twice to decide who would be ranked from 13th to 18th place. Karagümrük, Şeker Hilal, Vefa, and Yeşildirek were relegated.

Preliminary groups

Red group

Results

White group

Results

Final groups

Championship group

Results

Classification group

References

Turkish National League
1962–63 in Turkish football
Turkey